Since its independence in 1947, governments have not spent much on quality education in this region. While the literacy rates of the areas in Gilgit is higher than most of the citites in Pakistan, yet no professional universities were constructed in the region. In 2002, under the reign of Pervez Musharaff, a general university of the name of Karakoram International University was constructed. Various primary schools were constructed by NGO's from around the world including the Aga Khan Development Network.

Beginnings
At first, only primary and middle-schools were available. Gradually, these middle-schools were upgraded to high-schools. In the 1970s, students had to migrate in order to attend university. The revolution in education began when private schools began to emerge under the Jabir Bin Hayyan trust initiative. Then after a sudden several private schools began to emerge. According to one news report the private sector contributes 90% of the infrastructure for the overall education in Gilgit Baltistan. The Aga Khan foundation was also the other NGO which contributed to the spread of education.

Current education system
During the last decade the first higher education institutions were constructed. The first university, Karakoram University, was founded during the reign of Pervez Musharaf. The university was established in 2002 by a charter from the federal government on the orders of Pervez Musharraf, President of the Islamic Republic of Pakistan. A second University,  University of Baltistan was established in 2017, in Skardu. There are eighteen colleges in GB, including eight girls' colleges and ten boys' colleges. Ten of them are in the Gilgit district and seven are in the Skardu District. Seven are degree colleges, eight are intermediate and other two are elementary colleges. Due to the poor internet coverage in the region, students face problems when attending classes online. So far there are only two universities operating in Gilgit. These are:
 University of Baltistan, Skardu
 Karakoram International University  (KIU), Gilgit

Statistics
According to a World Bank Economic Report On Gilgit-Baltistan (2010–11), the net primary school enrolment in Gilgit Baltistan is 51%, the net middle-school enrollment is 17%, and only 14% are enrolled in matric school. In other words, only 17 out of every 100 students achieve the middle level and only 14 out of every 100 students reach to matric level.

According to a current survey, approximately a thousand students belonging to Baltistan are studying in different colleges and universities of Karachi. There are no medical or engineering colleges in the area. A large number of students are studying in different colleges and schools of Pakistan. However, seats for Gilgit-Baltistan are very limited in engineering and medical colleges.
There are no scholarship programs for higher education in GB. Medical colleges in Karachi do not provide a single seat for students coming from Gilgit-Baltistan. On September 29, 2009 Prime Minister Gillani announced the foundation of the first medical college. However, construction hasn't begun. Currently, the local government has allocated an amount of over Rs361 million (5.3% of the total budget) towards education in the area.

References

External links
Education in Gilgit-Baltistan - Pakistan Observer
Punial.com
Education in Gilgit-Baltistan - GB247

 
Gilgit Baltistan